Deconinck is a Dutch and Belgian surname. Notable people with the surname include:

Bernard Deconinck (1936–2020), French track cyclist
Jilke Deconinck (born 1995), Belgian footballer

See also
 De Coninck

Dutch-language surnames
Surnames of Belgian origin